Indian Hills High School is an alternative/continuation education high school in Agoura Hills, California, United States, serving students in grades 10–12. It is in the Las Virgenes Unified School District.

Originally the school was located in an old church building, in then Agoura, today Agoura Hills California. In 1978 the school was moved to a location in Calabasas, California. Calabasas. In 2008 Indian Hills relocated to the campus of Agoura High School in Agoura Hills to save money. The former campus was more recently used by New Village Leadership Academy, a private school.

Previous students

Indian Hills High School was the school attended by five of the seven members of the group dubbed "The Bling Ring". Alexis Neiers, Rachel Lee, Nick Prugo, Courtney Ames and Diana Tamayo all attended the school prior to their arrests.

References

External links
 Indian Hills High School
 Indian Hills High School (Archive)

High schools in Los Angeles County, California
Public high schools in California
Agoura Hills, California